Benjamin Barton may refer to:
 Benjamin Smith Barton (1766–1815), American botanist, naturalist, and physician
 Ben Barton (1823–1899), early white settler of the San Bernardino Valley